The Police Commissioner of Mumbai is the chief of the Mumbai Police, and an officer of the Indian Police Service. The Mumbai Police Commissioner is appointed by the Maharashtra State Government on the recommendation by the Establishment Board, which includes Additional Chief Secretary—Home department and other senior bureaucrats.

The first commissioner was Frank Souter, who was appointed in 1864.

The headquarters are opposite Crawford Market in South Mumbai.

Criticism
Julio Ribeiro wrote that some commissioners are appointed by lobbying. They are expected to repay the favour to the politicians. They transfer junior officials to positions where the politicians can make maximum illegal money.

List of Police Commissioners of Mumbai

List of former Police Commissioners of Mumbai:

See also 
 Commissioner of Police, Bangalore City
 Commissioner of Police, Delhi
 Police Commissioner of Kolkata

References 

Mumbai civic officials
Mumbai Police